Charles-Alexandre Debacq (1804 in Paris – 1853 in Paris) was a French historical and portrait painter. He became a pupil of Gros, and was greatly appreciated in his own country. There are several pictures by him at Versailles.

References
 

1804 births
1863 deaths
19th-century French painters
French male painters
Painters from Paris
Pupils of Antoine-Jean Gros
19th-century French male artists